Andrée Feix (15 February 1912 – 15 April 1987) was a French film editor and film director. She directed two films in the mid-1940s, making her debut with the comedy Once is Enough (1946).

Selected filmography

Editor
 The House of Mystery (1933)
 Little Jacques (1934)
 The Voyage to America (1951)
 Koenigsmark (1953)
 Yours Truly, Blake (1954)
 Black Orpheus (1959)
 Love in the Night (1968)

Director
 Once is Enough (1946)
 Captain Blomet (1947)

References

Bibliography
 Brigitte Rollet. Coline Serreau. Manchester University Press, 1998.

External links

1912 births
1987 deaths
French film editors
Film directors from Paris
French women film editors
French women film directors